Suprakash Som (26 October 1947 – 30 May 2008) was an Indian cricketer. He played two first-class matches for Bengal in 1965/66.

See also
 List of Bengal cricketers

References

External links
 

1947 births
2008 deaths
Indian cricketers
Bengal cricketers
Cricketers from Kolkata